Cabana Colony is a census-designated place in Palm Beach County, Florida, United States. Its population was 2,460 as of the 2020 census. Cabana Colony is located on the east side of State Road 811 and borders Palm Beach Gardens on three sides.

The 2010 U.S. Census depicts 42.2% of the population in Cabana Colony is male and the other 57.8% is female with a median age of 42.1 years old.

Demographics

Location

Cabana Colony is located in Palm Beach County and holds a zip code of 33410. The unified school district is palm beach county and neighboring cities include Palm Beach Gardens and Riviera Beach.

Housing
The estimated median house or condo value in Cabana Colony during 2016 was $269,600, whereas the estimated median for Florida as a whole was $197,700.

The median gross in rent in Cabana Colony in 2016 was $1,332.

Educational Attainment

In Cabana Colony, 71.2% of people over 25 years old have received their high school diplomas, while 15.7% received a higher degree and 13.1% have received no high school diploma.

Cabana Colony Park

The 1.64-acre park is a family friendly park located at 3855 Holiday Road, Palm Beach Gardens, Fl 33410. The park has amenities for children ages 2–12 years old as well as a basketball court. The park is maintained by the county government and also includes picnic tables and grills.

House of operation: Sunrise - Sunset.

Get in touch with the park officials: (561) 966-6600

References

Census-designated places in Palm Beach County, Florida
Census-designated places in Florida